Air Commodore Narendra was an officer of the Indian Air Force (IAF). One of the pioneers of the IAF, he last served as the Air Officer-in-charge Technical and Equipment Services at Air HQ. He was killed when his Dakota aircraft crashed near Gülnar in Southern Turkey. At the time of his death, he was the third senior-most officer of the IAF, after Air Marshals Subroto Mukerjee and Aspy Engineer.

Early life and education
Narendra was born in Fatehpur in the United Provinces of Agra and Oudh on 1 November 1912. He attended the University of Allahabad. While he was a student, he received the 'A' flying license from the Karachi flying club. He entered the RAF College Cranwell in early 1932. This was the third batch of Indian pilots at Cranwell and he was one of three Indian pilots in the batch, which included Wing Commander Karun Krishna Majumdar.

Military career
Narendra was commissioned on 16 December 1933 as a Pilot officer. After completing his training at Cranwell, he received further training at the Army Cooperation School at Old Sarum Airfield in Wiltshire. He returned to India and joined the No. 1 Squadron IAF. In 1936, a rebellion erupted in North-West Frontier Province (NWFP), led by the Pukhtoon tribes. The Indian Air Force were forced to play a major role in containing the rebellion, due to the harsh terrains of the region. He served with the squadron during the air operations in North-West Frontier Province.

In September 1941, Narendra was posted to the Initial Training Centre at Walton, Lahore. Later that year, he volunteered to join the 50th Parachute Brigade. He became the first Regular Air Force officer to qualify as a paratrooper. He subsequently served on the air staff of No. 224 Group RAF. The 224 Group was based out of Kolkata, and later at Chittagong. He was then posted to the Bengal Command, where he had aerodrome inspection duties and was responsible for the building of forward landing grounds in East Bengal and the Assam Province.

In October 1943, Narendra became the Air Force representative on the Directorate of Selection of personnel. On 12 May 1944, he was appointed the Officer-in-charge flying training and frontier air operations at RAF Base Kohat. He subsequently took command of the base later that year. In 1945, he was appointed Commandant of the Indian Air Training Corps.  After the war, he took command of the Royal Indian Air Force Depot in Arakkonam.

On 14 May 1947, he was promoted to the acting rank of Group Captain and was appointed Senior Officer-in-charge of Administration at No.2 Indian Group headquarters at Bangalore. He was promoted to the rank along with Wing Commander Mehar Singh.

Post-Independence
On 4 November 1947, Narendra was promoted to the acting rank of Air Commodore, the third Indian to hold the rank - after Subroto Mukerjee and Aspy Engineer. He was appointed the Air Officer Commanding No.2 Training Group, the precursor to the Training Command. The group comprised the majority of the ground training schools and all units of the RIAF in Southern India.

After a year-long tenure, he was appointed Air Officer-in-Charge Technical and Supply services at Air headquarters. One of the three Principal staff officers (PSO) at Air HQ, he had the directorates of Equipment and Technical services under him. The directorates had responsibility of procurement, maintenance and servicing of all aircraft of the RIAF. On 1 February 1949, the appointment was renamed to Air Officer-in-Charge Technical and Equipment Services. On 1 October 1951, he was made substantive Air Commodore.

Death
Narendra was flying a Dakota No. HJ-920 from England to India. While flying over the Mediterranean between Malta and Cyprus, the aircraft encountered adverse weather conditions over Cyprus. Emergency landing at Nicosia was not possible because of poor visibility. The aircraft lost its way in the fog and crashed near Gulnar in the Mersin province in Southern Turkey. The crash resulted in the death of all five crew. Along with Narendra were Flying Officer P. V. Phillipose, Flying Officer Sunil Kumar Ghosh, Sergeant B. S. Gill and Sergeant D'Souza.

The mortal remains of Narendra, Ghosh and Gill were cremated with full military honours by the Gendarmarie at Gulnar. Phillipose and D'Souza were buried at the cemetery in Mersin by the Turkish Army.The Ambassador of India to Turkey, C. S. Jha, the Governor and Mayor of Mersin, the military attache and officials from the Embassy of India in Ankara, Foreign Consuls and officers and men of the Turkish Armed Forces paid tribute.

Personal life
Narendra was married to Devinderbir Kaur Sahiba, the daughter of Ranbir Singh Jind, the Maharaja of Jind State. The couple had a daughter. A son was born a few months after Narendra's death. His brothers-in-law, husbands of his wife's sisters, were Air Commodores R. H. D. Singh and J. C. Verma. His wife's brother, Flying Officer Gajinder Bir Singh also was an officer in the RIAF.

See also
 List of accidents and incidents involving military aircraft (1950–1954)

References

1912 births
1951 deaths
Indian Air Force officers
Graduates of the Royal Air Force College Cranwell
Indian aviators
Aviators killed in aviation accidents or incidents in Turkey
Victims of aviation accidents or incidents in 1951